Waitohi, Waitohi Flat and Upper Waitohi are small farming centres from 5 to 16 km west of Temuka and north of the Opihi river, South Canterbury in New Zealand. They are about 20 km north of Timaru.

It is the area where Richard Pearse, a pioneer aviator, lived and farmed. From 1902 to 1904, Richard Pearce built and flew experimental aircraft on his Waitohi farm and managed to achieve powered flight.

Demographics
The Waitohi statistical area includes Winchester and Milford Huts, and surrounds but does not include Temuka.

The statistical area had a population of 1,761 at the 2018 New Zealand census, an increase of 24 people (1.4%) since the 2013 census, and an increase of 159 people (9.9%) since the 2006 census. There were 696 households. There were 927 males and 834 females, giving a sex ratio of 1.11 males per female. The median age was 38.7 years (compared with 37.4 years nationally), with 366 people (20.8%) aged under 15 years, 318 (18.1%) aged 15 to 29, 828 (47.0%) aged 30 to 64, and 249 (14.1%) aged 65 or older.

Ethnicities were 85.2% European/Pākehā, 12.6% Māori, 1.0% Pacific peoples, 6.5% Asian, and 4.1% other ethnicities (totals add to more than 100% since people could identify with multiple ethnicities).

The proportion of people born overseas was 16.4%, compared with 27.1% nationally.

Although some people objected to giving their religion, 52.8% had no religion, 35.8% were Christian, 1.2% were Hindu, 0.2% were Muslim, 0.3% were Buddhist and 2.0% had other religions.

Of those at least 15 years old, 186 (13.3%) people had a bachelor or higher degree, and 327 (23.4%) people had no formal qualifications. The median income was $35,500, compared with $31,800 nationally. The employment status of those at least 15 was that 789 (56.6%) people were employed full-time, 213 (15.3%) were part-time, and 33 (2.4%) were unemployed.

References

External links
 Hurunui Horse Trecks, The Waitohi Wanderer
  Waitohi Cyclopedia of New Zealand, 1903

Timaru District
Populated places in Canterbury, New Zealand